For the cycling competitions at the 2018 Central American and Caribbean Games, the following qualification systems took place.

Summary

Legend
TS – Team Sprint
KE – Keirin
SP – Sprint
TP – Team Pursuit
OM – Omnium
RR – Road Race
TT – Individual Time Trial
SR – Scratch Race
MA – Madison 
PR – Points Race
IR – Individual Pursuit
Q – Quotas
R – Riders

References

Qualification